Barry Atsma (born 29 December 1972) is a Dutch actor. He became known in the Netherlands through his role in the TV series Rozengeur & Wodka Lime (2001–2005) and the movie The Black Book. He is a recipient of both a Golden Calf and a Rembrandt Award. Internationally, Atsma is best known for his work on 2014 British film Hector and the Search for Happiness and the 2018 British television series The Split.

Early life and education
Barry Atsma was born on December 29, 1972, in Bromley, South London. Atsma's father travelled a lot for work and, as a result, Atsma spent his childhood between England, Greece, Brazil and The Netherlands. He initially studied law but soon switched to studying drama at Utrecht School of the Arts, where he graduated in 1996.

Personal life
From 1994 to 2011, Atsma was in a relationship with actress Izaira Kersten. They have two daughters together, Zoë and Charley. He is currently in a relationship with actress Noortje Herlaar, with whom he now has two daughters, Bobbi and Sam.

Filmography

Film

Television

Awards and nominations

References

External links

 
 

1972 births
Living people
20th-century Dutch male actors
21st-century Dutch male actors
Dutch male actors
Dutch male film actors
Dutch male television actors
People from the London Borough of Bromley
Male actors from London